The Munich Biennale is a contemporary opera and music theatre festival in the city of Munich. The full German name is Internationales Festival für neues Musiktheater, literally: International Festival for New Music Theater. The biennial festival was created in 1988 by Hans Werner Henze and is held in even-numbered years over 2–3 weeks in the late spring. The festival concentrates on world premieres of theater-related contemporary music, with a particular focus on commissioning first operas from young composers.

History

Hans Werner Henze's artistic directorship (1988–1996)
Henze, himself a prolific composer of operas, described the genesis of the festival like this: 

Henze curated the first four festivals, from 1988 to 1994, and established the general format of most of the festivals that followed. Short runs of the premiered operas are preceded by talks and additional concerts from the featured composers, to introduce the audiences to their ideas and music.

Peter Ruzicka's artistic directorship (1996–2014)
Peter Ruzicka took over as artistic director ("one of the most influential administrative/ artistic positions in the European music-theatre scene") in 1996, with that year's biennale being jointly curated by Henze.  Ruzicka broadened the scope of the works presented, with more emphasis on works using multimedia, and moving away from the text-based sources that characterised the period curated by Henze.

Manos Tsangaris and Daniel Ott's artistic directorship (2016–) 
The composers Manos Tsangaris and Daniel Ott took over as joint artistic directors of the Biennale, starting in 2016. Their approach to curation further expanded the festival's remit beyond opera, to reflect an 'expanded composition term' and the 'open field' of new music theatre which spans '[f]rom new opera to scenic installation, from minimalized artistic interventions in municipal spaces to composed performance'.

Operas given at the Munich Biennale
World premieres are marked as WP

Significance
The Munich Biennale has provided first or early commissions for stage works from many composers now established as opera composers, such as Mark-Anthony Turnage, Detlev Glanert, Gerd Kühr, Hans-Jürgen von Bose, Param Vir, Toshio Hosokawa and Violeta Dinescu.

The strongly international scope of the festival has meant that it has been able to offer opportunities missing at a national level.

References
Notes

Sources
münchener biennale Festival website  Retrieved 13 March 2012

External links
Peter & Alexa Woolf: Munich Biennale 2000 (Contemporary Music Festival) 4–19 May 2000 (PGW & AW) musicweb-international.com 2000
John Warnaby: Tenth Münchener Biennale musicweb-international.com 20 May 2006
Komponieren für die reine Natur Münchener Merkur 23 April 2010 
Münchener Biennale / Urwald-Symphonie und surrealer Seelentrip Bayerischer Rundfunk 14 May 2010 
Gerhard Rohde: Münchener Biennale / Wozu der ganze Aufwand? FAZ 12 May 2010 

Opera festivals
Contemporary classical music festivals
Music festivals in Germany
Biennale